Morev is a Russian masculine surname, its feminine counterpart is Moreva. Notable people with the surname include:

Andrey Morev (born 1973), Kazakh footballer

See also
More (surname)

Russian-language surnames